"Take Me Down" is a song recorded by American country music band Alabama.  It was released in May 1982 as the second single from Alabama's album Mountain Music.

Written by Exile band members Mark Gray and J.P. Pennington, the song was originally recorded by Exile in 1980. The Exile version was released as a single, but failed to become a major hit, although it reached number 102 on the US Bubbling Under chart and number 11 in South Africa.

However, it was not until Alabama released the song that it was the group's seventh number one on the country chart. In addition to its success on the country charts, the song fared modestly well on pop radio, reaching No. 18 on the Billboard Hot 100.

Single and album edits
The single edit to "Take Me Down," released for retail sale and radio airplay, is about 1:10 shorter than the full-length album version. Excised from the single version:

 The second refrain; the song immediately proceeds from the second verse into the bridge.
 An earlier fade during the ending harmony part (about 30 seconds earlier than the album version).

"B" side
The B-side to "Take Me Down" is a song titled "Lovin' You Is Killin' Me," a re-recording of one of Alabama's earliest songs. "Lovin' You Is Killin' Me" originally appeared as the B-side to the band's first charted single, 1977's "I Wanna Be With You Tonight."

Charts

Exile

Alabama

Year-end charts

Cover version
The song was covered in by soul singer Johnny Bristol the same year and released as the first single off his Free to Be Me album.

References

Works cited
Morris, Edward, "Alabama," Contemporary Books Inc., Chicago, 1985

1982 singles
1980 songs
Alabama (American band) songs
Exile (American band) songs
Songs written by Mark Gray (singer)
Songs written by J.P. Pennington
Song recordings produced by Harold Shedd
RCA Records Nashville singles
1982 songs